Ed Spielman (born in Brooklyn, New York City, US) is a writer and producer. He is one of the creators of the TV series Kung Fu. Spielman wrote the story and teleplay for the series pilot, which has been credited as "the first American Martial Arts film." He also created the TV series The Young Riders starring Stephen Baldwin and Josh Brolin, and co-created with his brother the series Dead Man's Gun.

Spielman authored a biography of Joe Greenstein titled The Mighty Atom: The Life and Times of Joseph L. Greenstein, released in 1979. According to a reviewer with the American Library Association, The Mighty Atom was "one of the year's best books.". The book was later rereleased as "The Spiritual Journey of Joseph L. Greenstein: The Mighty Atom, World's Strongest Man".

The National Cowboy & Western Heritage Museum has awarded Spielman personally the Western Heritage Award four times, and his shows seven times.

References 

Writers from New York City
Living people
Year of birth missing (living people)